Frank the Entertainer in a Basement Affair (sometimes stylized Frank the Entertainer... in a Basement Affair) is a VH1 reality television show starring Frank "The Entertainer" Maresca, who previously starred in I Love New York, I Love Money, and I Love Money 2. Unlike other dating shows, the contestants live with Frank and his parents in a house down the street from Frank's real home. The show premiered on January 3, 2010, with the series to run a total of 11 episodes. Fifteen women competed for his love. The winner was Kerry Schwartz.

Contestants

Call-out order

 The contestant won Frank's Love
 The contestant won a solo date with Frank
 The contestant won a solo date with Frank, and received a key before the elimination ceremony.
 The contestant went on a group date with Frank
 The contestant was eliminated outside of Elimination Ceremony.
 The contestant was eliminated.
 The contestant won a date with Frank, but was eliminated.
 The contestant decided to leave

 In Episode 2, Mandy was eliminated before the ceremony due to Frank's mother's objection to her being in the house.
 In Episode 11, Frank tells the ladies that in a unanimous vote they had to decide who of the three will be going home.

Episodes

Episode 1: "Meet The Marescas"

First aired January 3, 2010 

The fifteen female contestants meet Frank Maresca and his parents.  A photographer takes a family picture of each contestant with Frank and his parents. Frank consults with his parents when deciding whom to eliminate. In the end, Kari M. and Stephanie are eliminated. Frank's mom had previously expressed that she liked Kari more than Mandy, and was disappointed with Frank's decision.

Bottom 3: Kari M., Mandy, Stephanie
Eliminated: Kari M., Stephanie

Reasons for Elimination 
Kari M.: Frank didn't feel a connection with her.
Stephanie: Frank felt she didn't know anything about him.

Episode 2: "A Big Decision"
First aired: January 10, 2010 

As the episode beings, Frank informs the women that they will each be given an opportunity to showcase one of their talents.  Each contestant will be given two minutes in the basement with Frank.  The three women whose talents impress Frank the most will be invited on a group date to the Brooklyn bridge.  Frank uses his microwave as a timer for each date. During the challenge, Christy decided to teach Frank hula-hooping even though he was better at it than she was. Cathy was late for her timeslot, which upset Frank, and as a result, she was only allowed one minute. Frank's mom interrupts Mandy's time, due to her distrust of Mandy. In the end, Frank is most impressed by Felicia, Kerry, and Renee.  After the date, the women have a party outside in the hot tub.  Cathy becomes inebriated, which upsets Frank, as he doesn't want her to wake up his parents. Frank's mom discovers vodka in one of the water bottles, and accuses Mandy of placing it there.  Later, she further implores Frank to eliminate Mandy. Rather than make Mandy suffer through elimination, Frank privately asks her to leave.  At elimination, Cathy and Jessica are in the bottom two, and it is Jessica who is eliminated.

Challenge: Two Minutes In Heaven
Winners: Felicia, Kerry, Renee
Bottom 2: Cathy, Jessica
Eliminated: Mandy, Jessica

Reasons for Elimination
Mandy: Frank felt his mom doesn't like Mandy and feared that both of them will not get along with each other.
Jessica: Frank felt that she has a lack of focus in her life.

Episode 3: "Haggle For My Love"

First aired: January 17, 2010 

The Marescas are having a garage sale and wants his girls to sell items for money, whichever teams earns the most money wins the date with Frank.  With a sluggish start, the yellow team had an idea giving massages for $10, but it irritates Mrs. Maresca.  The Blue Team had also had an idea of drawing portraits from Annie.  The garage sale ends and the Blue Team won the challenge, earning the most money.  Frank took the winning team to a bar.  The next day, Frank took Tammy and Christi to a cupcake shop.  Frank felt he couldn't understand Tammy sometimes, but Christi gave the scoop about Renee spying on Frank.  During elimination, Jenny and Tammy were at the Bottom 2, and ultimately Tammy was sent home.

Challenge: Maresca's Garage Sale
Yellow Team: Christi, Tammy, Felicia
Blue Team: Annie, Dana, Jenny
Pink Team: Cathy, Renee
Green Team: Kerry, Melody, Melissa
Challenge Winners: Annie, Dana, Jenny
Bottom 2: Tammy, Jenny
Eliminated: Tammy

Reasons for Elimination
Tammy: Frank couldn't connect with her and he couldn't understand want she's saying.

Episode 4: "Getting To First Base"

First aired: January 24, 2010 

Challenge: 1st Annual Bikini Softball Game
Team Spaghetti: Cathy, Melissa, Christi, Melody, Jenny
Team Meatballs: Kerry, Felicia, Renee, Dana, Annie
Challenge Winners: Kerry, Felicia, Renee, Dana, Annie
MVP: Annie
Bottom 2: Jenny, Renee
Eliminated: Jenny

Reasons for Elimination
Jenny: Frank found a sexy photo of her on the internet despite her "conservative" act and Frank feels that she wasn't into him which upset not only him, but his parents as well.

Episode 5: "Nine Franks Are Better Than One"

First aired: January 31, 2010 

Challenge: To Take Care Of 9 Little Franks
Challenge Winners: Melody, Kerry S.
Bottom 2:: Felicia, Christi
Eliminated: Christi

Reasons for Elimination
Christi: Frank felt that he cannot trust Christi after finding out she is still friends with her ex-boyfriend and plus, his parents felt like she was way too young and immature for Frank.

Episode 6: "Meet The Rest Of The Marescas"

First aired: February 14, 2010 

Challenge: To Meet The Entire Maresca Family
Challenge Winner: Felicia
Bottom 2:: Melissa, Renee
Eliminated: Renee

Reasons for Elimination
Renee: Frank felt that she was too weird.

Episode 7: "Sucker Punch My Heart"

First aired: February 21, 2010 

Challenge: To Sing For Frank And His Parents
Team 1 / Working Out: Cathy, Melissa
Team 2 / Video Games: Felicia, Melody
Team 3 / Muscle Tees: Kerry S.
Team 4 / Sleeping In: Annie, Dana
Challenge Winner/s: Felicia, Melody
Bottom 2: Annie, Melody
Eliminated: Annie
Reason for Elimination:
Annie: She told Frank to let her go if he didn't have feelings for her. Even though she was a sweet girl, her parents felt like that Annie wasn't really his type.

Episode 8: "Big Dreams, Little Italy"

First aired: February 28, 2010 

Challenge: To Plan A Future With Frank
Challenge Winner: Kerry S.
Bottom 2: Dana, Melissa
Eliminated: Melissa
Reason for Elimination:
Melissa: Frank felt that he would get along better with Melissa as a friend.

Episode 9: "We Need Therapy!"

First aired: March 14, 2010 

Challenge: Therapy With Girls
Challenge Winner: N/A
Dates: Melody, Felicia, Dana
Bottom 2: Dana, Melody
Eliminated: Melody
Reason for Elimination:
Melody: Frank felt that Melody was too good for him.

Episode 10: "A Family Affair"

First aired: March 21, 2010

Challenge: Meet Possible Future In-Laws
Challenge Winner: None
Bottom 2: Dana, Kerry S.
Eliminated: Dana
Reason for Elimination:
Dana: Frank felt that Dana was too young for him.

Episode 11: "Get Me Out of the Basement!"

First aired: March 28, 2010

Final 2: Cathy, Kerry S.
Eliminated/Quit: Felicia
Reason for Elimination:
Felicia: The challenge was choosing between the three last contestants, which girl should go home, and Felicia quit the competition after saying that she felt that Frank had more connection with Kerry and Cathy.
Winner: Kerry S.
Runner-up: Cathy

After the show
Frank and Kerry broke up after three days.

Frank's father, Gary Maresca, died on November 16, 2010, after a battle with pancreatic cancer. He was 62 years old.

References

External links

2010 American television series debuts
2010 American television series endings
2010s American reality television series
American dating and relationship reality television series
English-language television shows
VH1 original programming
Television series by 51 Minds Entertainment
Television series by Endemol